Located at 280 Main Street, Wellsburg, New York, Christ Episcopal Church was built in 1869.  The church was designed by Isaac G. Perry, of Binghamton, New York. It was listed on the National Register of Historic Places in 2000.

References

External links
Christ Episcopal Church, Wellsburg, New York

Churches on the National Register of Historic Places in New York (state)
Carpenter Gothic church buildings in New York (state)
Churches completed in 1869
19th-century Episcopal church buildings
Episcopal church buildings in New York (state)
Episcopal Church in New York (state)
Churches in Chemung County, New York
1869 establishments in New York (state)
National Register of Historic Places in Chemung County, New York